The Science Council is a UK organisation that was established by Royal Charter in 2003. The principal activity of The Science Council is the promotion of the advancement and dissemination of knowledge of and education in science pure and applied, for the public benefit. The Science Council is the Competent Authority with respect to the European Union directive 2005/36/EC. It is a membership organisation for learned and professional bodies across science and its applications and works with them to represent this sector to government and others. Together, the member organisations represent over 350,000 scientists. The Science Council provides a forum for discussion and exchange of views and works to foster collaboration between member organisations and the wider science, technology, engineering, mathematics and medical communities to enable inter-disciplinary contributions to science policy and the application of science.

History Timeline 
The Science Council was founded in 2003 by the late Professor Sir Gareth Roberts FRS, who served as the council's Founding President. In February 2007, Sir Tom McKillop FRS, became the President of the Science Council and he was succeeded in June 2011 by Professor Sir Tom Blundell, and then by Professor Sir Keith Burnett FRS in June 2016. In May 2021 Professor Carole Mundell was appointed the new president.

In November 2008 the Science Council launched Future Morph, a website aimed at providing children, parents, teachers and the general public with information about science and how it might help in future careers.

In 2015 an amended Charter was granted a Privy Council seal.

Purpose
The Science Council's charitable purpose as stated in its 2015 Royal Charter is “to promote the advancement and dissemination of knowledge of and education in science, pure and applied, for the public benefit.”

To fulfil this purpose, the Science Council advances professionalism in science through the professional registration of scientists and technicians who meet a high professional standard and competence and follow an established code of conduct.

The Science Council's Royal Charter also defines its role as an umbrella organisation, providing a forum to connect members for discussion and information exchange. This supports our members in furthering their own commitment to advance science for the public's benefit.

The Science Council provides member bodies with a forum to raise standards through sharing practice and knowledge, and to hold each other to account through a peer-review approach. A successful example of this approach is the recent Diversity, Equality and Inclusion programme of work.

Designations 
The Science Council promotes the profession and contribution of science and scientists through the Chartered Scientist (CSci), Registered Scientist (RSci), Registered Science Technician (RSciTech) and Chartered Science Teacher (CSciTech) designations and the development of codes of practice.

Chartered Science Teacher was launched in 2004. Registered Science Technician and Registered Scientist were launched in October 2011 alongside the Chartered Scientist award, to build a framework of professional standards and recognition across the science workforce

Member organisations 
 Association for Clinical Biochemistry and Laboratory Medicine
 Association for Science Education
 Association for Simulated Practice in Healthcare
 Association of Anatomical Pathology Technology
 Association of Neurophysiological Scientists
 Biochemical Society
 British Association of Sport and Exercise Sciences
 British Psychological Society
 British Society of Soil Scientists
 Chartered Institution of Water and Environmental Management
 College of Podiatry
 Geological Society of London
 Institute of Animal Technology
 Institute of Biomedical Science
 Institute of Corrosion
 Institute of Food Science and Technology
 Institute of Marine Engineering, Science and Technology
 Institute of Materials, Minerals and Mining
 Institute of Mathematics and its Applications
 Institute of Physics
 Institute of Physics and Engineering in Medicine
 Institute of Science and Technology
 Institute of Water
 Institution of Chemical Engineers
 Institution of Environmental Sciences
 The Nuclear Institute
 Oil and Colour Chemists' Association
 Operational Research Society
 Royal Astronomical Society
 Royal Meteorological Society
 Royal Society of Biology
 Royal Society of Chemistry
 Royal Statistical Society
 Society of Dyers and Colourists
 The Organisation for Professionals in Regulatory Affairs

To become a member of the Science Council your organisation must:
 Be an independent professional body which exists for the collective pursuit of professional aims and objectives with practicing scientists in your membership
 Have at least one membership category which is based on standards of competence (i.e. appropriate qualification and / or relevant professional practice)
 Become a signatory to the Science Council Declaration on Diversity, Equality and Inclusion
 Have a code of conduct for your members

References

External links
 The Science Council web page
 Definition of Science

Educational organisations based in London
Organisations based in the London Borough of Islington
Professional associations based in the United Kingdom
2003 establishments in the United Kingdom
Science education in the United Kingdom
Scientific organizations established in 2003
Scientific societies based in the United Kingdom